Skjold Church is a parish church of the Church of Norway in Vindafjord Municipality in Rogaland county, Norway. It is located in the village of Skjold. It is the church for the Skjold parish which is part of the Haugaland prosti (deanery) in the Diocese of Stavanger. The white, stone church was built in a octagonal design in 1998 using designs by the architect Nils A. Vikanes. The church seats about 400 people.

History 
The earliest existing historical records of the church date back to the year 1322, but it was likely founded during the 13th century. In 1645, the old wooden church was torn down and replaced with a new timber-framed cruciform building. In 1768, the church was mostly dismantled and rebuilt - whether or not to consider the result a brand new church or a significant renovation is not known.

In 1814, this church served as an election church. Together with more than 300 other parish churches across Norway, it was a polling station for elections to the 1814 Norwegian Constituent Assembly which wrote the Constitution of Norway. This was Norway's first national elections. Each church parish was a constituency that elected people called "electors" who later met together in each county to elect the representatives for the assembly that was to meet in Eidsvoll later that year.

The old church was torn down in 1888 after the new church was in use, and its materials were sold at auction. The new building was consecrated on 26 October 1887. It was a huge timber-framed church that seated about 750 people. It had a long church design with a tower on the west end and a rectangular chancel flanked by sacristies on the east end. Some of the interior furniture was inherited from the previous church including the altarpiece and pulpit (both made in the 1620s).

On 13 September 1992, the church burned to the ground in a fire set by Varg Vikernes and Samoth in a case of deliberate arson. The church was replaced in 1998 by the present church building that was designed by Nils Vikanes. The new octagonal church was consecrated on 16 May 1999. The nave has white painted walls and red floor tiles and is furnished with chairs. The choir in the east is raised a few steps above the nave. There is a balcony with seating above the main entrance.

Media gallery

See also
List of churches in Rogaland

References

Vindafjord
Churches in Rogaland
Stone churches in Norway
Octagonal churches in Norway
20th-century Church of Norway church buildings
Churches completed in 1998
13th-century establishments in Norway
Norwegian election church
Churches destroyed by arson
Buildings and structures in Norway destroyed by arson